Anatoly Kamnev (27 November 1948 – 10 November 1992) was a Russian boxer. He competed in the men's light welterweight event at the 1972 Summer Olympics.

References

1948 births
1992 deaths
Russian male boxers
Olympic boxers of the Soviet Union
Boxers at the 1972 Summer Olympics
Martial artists from Moscow
Light-welterweight boxers